Museum of Brisbane  (MoB) explores contemporary and historic Brisbane, Australia, and its people through a program of art and social history exhibitions, workshops, talks, tours and children's activities. Located on Level 3, of Brisbane City Hall in the city's CBD, the Museum and its staff are highly regarded for their innovation and contemporary international practice across the museum and gallery sector.

The recipient of a number of major awards during its brief history, the Museum has been twice been awarded the top honour at the prestigious Museums and Galleries National Awards as well as  multiple Queensland Museum and Gallery Achievement Awards, Museums Australia Multimedia and Publications Design Awards and National Trust of Queensland Awards.

History
Museum of Brisbane (MoB) was opened in October 2003 and occupied a space on the ground floor of City Hall. The museum replaced the Brisbane City Gallery which opened in 1977. In 2010, when City Hall closed for restoration, the Museum was relocated to Ann Street. On 6 April 2013 the Museum was reopened after returning to City Hall where it now occupies a purpose-built space on the building's third floor. Since its reopening the Museum has been an independent, not-for-profit arts organisation overseen by a board chaired by Sallyanne Atkinson.

Collection

The Museum of Brisbane manages two collections, the Museum of Brisbane Collection and the City of Brisbane Collection. The collection was created in 1859 when the Town of Brisbane (a local government area which preceded the City of Brisbane) was founded. It has grown to have more than 9,000 items including commissioned works by local artists, the largest textile collection from designers Easton Pearson and historical objects.

Visiting
Museum of Brisbane is open daily from 10:00 to 17:00, except for New Year's Day, Good Friday, Christmas Day, and Boxing Day, when it is closed. The Museum also closes on Monday's during school term for MoB Learn Mondays. Entry to the Museum is free, except for special exhibitions and programs.

The nearest bus station to the Museum is King George Square, while Central and Roma Street are the nearest train stations. Paid parking is available in the King George Square Car Park, which is located underneath King George Square.

References

External links

Official site

2003 establishments in Australia
Museums established in 2003
Museums in Brisbane
History museums in Australia
History of Brisbane
Neoclassical architecture in Australia
Brisbane, Museum of
Brisbane central business district
Art museums and galleries in Queensland